The 1886 Chicago White Stockings season was the 15th season of the Chicago White Stockings franchise, the 11th in the National League and the 2nd at the first West Side Park. The White Stockings finished first in the National League with a record of 90–34, 2.5 games ahead of the second place Detroit Wolverines. The team was defeated four games to two by the St. Louis Browns in the 1886 World Series.

Regular season

Season standings

Record vs. opponents

Roster

Player stats

Batting

Starters by position 
Note: Pos = Position; G = Games played; AB = At bats; H = Hits; Avg. = Batting average; HR = Home runs; RBI = Runs batted in

Other batters 
Note: G = Games played; AB = At bats; H = Hits; Avg. = Batting average; HR = Home runs; RBI = Runs batted in

Pitching

Starting pitchers 
Note: G = Games pitched; IP = Innings pitched; W = Wins; L = Losses; ERA = Earned run average; SO = Strikeouts

Relief pitchers 
Note: G = Games pitched; W = Wins; L = Losses; SV = Saves; ERA = Earned run average; SO = Strikeouts

1886 World Series 

The White Stockings lost the 1886 World Series to the St. Louis Browns, four games to two.

References 
1886 Chicago White Stockings season at Baseball Reference

Chicago Cubs seasons
Chicago White Stockings season
National League champion seasons
World Series champion seasons
Chicago Cubs